Alvada is an unincorporated community in western Big Spring Township, Seneca County, Ohio, United States. It has a post office with the ZIP code 44802. It is located along the concurrency of U.S. Route 23 and State Route 199.

History
A post office called Alvada has been in operation since 1877. By 1880, Alvada had 63 inhabitants.

References

Unincorporated communities in Seneca County, Ohio
Unincorporated communities in Ohio